John Cocking is an English former professional football defender who spent seven seasons in the National Professional Soccer League and North American Soccer League.

Cocking, who played as a defender, played for the Atlanta Chiefs between 1967 and 1973, making a total of 108 appearances - 4 in the NPSL and 104 in the NASL.

References
NASL career stats

1944 births
Living people
English footballers
English expatriate footballers
Atlanta Chiefs players
National Professional Soccer League (1967) players
North American Soccer League (1968–1984) players
Expatriate soccer players in the United States
Association football defenders
English expatriate sportspeople in the United States